Stay Hungry is a film directed by Bob Rafelson, adapted from a novel of the same title by Charles Gaines.

Stay Hungry may also refer to:

 Stay Hungry (album), an album by Twisted Sister
 "Stay Hungry", a song from the aforementioned album by Twisted Sister and later covered by Fozzy
 "Stay Hungry", a song by Talking Heads from More Songs About Buildings and Food

See also
Still Hungry (disambiguation)
Stay Hungry Stay Foolish